The 2013 Kuwaiti-Supercup was the sixth Kuwait Super Cup, an annual football match contested by the winners of the previous season's Kuwaiti Premier League and Kuwait Emir Cup competitions.
It featured AL Kuwait, winners of the 2012–13 Kuwaiti Premier League and the Kuwait Emir Cup runner-up Al Qadsia at Ali Al-Salem Al-Sabah Stadium.

Match details

Kuwait Super Cup
Super
Kuwait SC matches